Iorras Aithneach is an Irish-speaking peninsula in the West of County Galway with about 2,000 people living in the area.  It is a predominantly Irish-speaking area, with 80% able to speak the language.

Carna and Cill Chiaráin are the two main villages. There are three electoral divisions, Abhainn Ghabhla, Scainimh and Cnoc Buí.

Education

Carna is home to the National University of Ireland, Galway educational centre which offers a range of third-level courses. There is an Irish language college for second-level students in Carna and Cill Chiaráin called Coláiste Sheosaimh.

See also

Connemara
Conamara Theas
Gaeltacht Cois Fharraige
Ceantar na nOileán
Joyce Country
Aran Islands

References

County Galway Gaeltacht Development Plan p58

Gaeltacht places in County Galway
Peninsulas of Ireland